"Lord of the Flies" is an Iron Maiden single and second track on their 1995 album The X Factor.  The song is based on the book and film of the same name.

Background
The single was only released outside of the UK. Additional tracks on the single include covers from UFO and The Who. These tracks were later released in the UK on CD1 of the "Virus" single.

Iron Maiden frequently performed this song live during their Dance of Death tour from 2003–2004, making it one of only 5 Bayley era songs to remain in live set lists after his departure (the others being "Man on the Edge", "Sign of the Cross", "Futureal", and "The Clansman"). One such performance of this song is included on Iron Maiden's 2005 live album "Death on the Road".

The guitar solo in their single, "Lord of the Flies" is played by Janick Gers.

Track listing
CD & 12" Single

Personnel
Blaze Bayley – vocals
Dave Murray – guitar
Janick Gers – guitar, backing vocals
Steve Harris – bass guitar, backing vocals
Nicko McBrain – drums

References

Iron Maiden songs
1996 singles
Songs written by Steve Harris (musician)
Songs written by Janick Gers
1995 songs
EMI Records singles
Music based on novels